William Muir (born October 26, 1942) is a former American football coach who served as the offensive coordinator for the Tampa Bay Buccaneers and later as the offensive coordinator and offensive line coach of the  Kansas City Chiefs. Muir was fired from the Buccaneers along with five fellow assistant coaches on January 18, 2009. Muir has coached for eight NFL franchises, three different colleges, and two minor league football teams with over 40 years combined coaching experience. 

Muir announced his retirement from coaching on February 1, 2012.  

Muir graduated attended Susquehanna University, where he was a member of the Lambda Chi Alpha fraternity and graduated in 1965.

References

1942 births
Living people
New England Patriots coaches
Indianapolis Colts coaches
Tampa Bay Buccaneers coaches
Philadelphia Eagles coaches
Kansas City Chiefs coaches
National Football League offensive coordinators
Susquehanna River Hawks football players